Tuixent is a village in the municipality of Josa i Tuixén, in Catalonia, Spain, and an independent municipality until 1973, when it was merged with Josa de Cadí.

References

Bibliography

Populated places in Alt Urgell